William Lemuel Hall (July 30, 1928 – January 1, 1986) was an American professional baseball player, a catcher who played parts of three seasons in Major League Baseball with the Pittsburgh Pirates.

Hall played his entire, 13-year professional career in the Pittsburgh system, signing with the Pirates before the 1947 season. He played six seasons at the highest levels of minor league baseball with the Open-Classification Hollywood Stars and the Triple-A Salt Lake Bees and Columbus Jets.  He appeared in 57 MLB games for the Pirates, 51 of them during the 1958 season, when he batted .284 in 116 at bats. Among his 33 hits were six doubles and one home run.

In between, Hall played winter ball with the Navegantes del Magallanes club of the Venezuelan Professional Baseball League during the 1955-56 season.

Hall retired after the 1960 season, and died in Moultrie at the age of 57 on New Year's Day 1986.

References

1928 births
1986 deaths
Bartlesville Oilers players
Baseball players from Georgia (U.S. state)
Charleston Rebels players
Columbus Jets players
Hollywood Stars players
Hutchinson Elks players
Keokuk Pirates players
Leesburg Pirates players
Major League Baseball catchers
Navegantes del Magallanes players
American expatriate baseball players in Venezuela
New Orleans Pelicans (baseball) players
People from Moultrie, Georgia
Pittsburgh Pirates players
Salt Lake City Bees players
Williamsport Grays players